The Ceaca is a left tributary of the river Șimișna in Romania. It flows into the Șimișna in Hășmaș.

References

Rivers of Romania
Rivers of Sălaj County